Appu Kuttan (born 1941, Kerala, India), is an Indian American philanthropist, consultant, author, and the founder and chairman of the National Education Foundation (NEF), a global non-profit organization, founded in 1989. His philanthropic efforts include the distribution of over one million individualized courses at substantially reduced rates to public schools and colleges. He is the developer of Management By Systems (MBS) and Cyberlearning. He has written several books and articles, including Happy Executive — A Systems Approach; Nurturing Mind, Body and Soul and From Digital Divide to Digital Opportunity (Amazon Reviews). He has served as an advisor to President Bill Clinton, India Prime Minister Rajiv Gandhi, the president of Venezuela, and the Mauritius prime minister.

Kuttan has led a number of national and international reform programs addressing issues including traffic improvement (Puerto Rico), social security and healthcare reform (Venezuela), literacy and internet access improvement (Egypt), health and fitness through 'CardioSalsa' and 'Running Pushups' (USA), and STEM+ Education (USA). A former athlete and owner of a global tennis academy, he mentored several tennis players including Andre Agassi and Monica Seles.

Early life, education 
Appu Kuttan was born in 1941 in  Kerala, India. He received his bachelor's degree in Electrical Engineering from the Kerala University in 1963, and moved to the United States in 1964 on a Tata scholarship to attend Washington University in St. Louis. He graduated from Washington University with a master's degree in 1966, and then earned a PhD in industrial engineering at the University of Wisconsin-Madison in 1968.

Early career 
Early in his career, Kuttan created the Management By Systems (MBS) concept of setting specific goals and objectives, and achieving them by deploying available resources systematically and effectively. In the 1970s, he was invited by the Governor of Puerto Rico to improve their traffic system by applying his MBS strategies. Specifically, through implementing his innovative 3 E's philosophy (Effectiveness, Efficiency, Effort), he was able to improve the management of delinquent traffic officers and by reducing public drunkenness, he achieved a dramatic 20% reduction in traffic related death. Soon after, he worked with the Venezuelan government to improve their social security and healthcare programs.

In 1980, he served as an informal adviser to future Indian Prime Minister Rajiv Gandhi, focusing on how to make India an information technology power using India's educated manpower, strategies that were later implemented when Gandhi took power in 1984. He also advised the Prime Minister of Mauritius on making Mauritius an IT-focused nation, and has advised the U.S. administrations of Bill Clinton, George W. Bush, and Barack Obama.

In 1986, he purchased the Nick Bollettieri Tennis Academy in Florida and helped develop and mentor tennis world champions Andre Agassi and Monica Seles.

National Education Foundation 
Founded by Kuttan in 1989 with proceeds from the sale of the tennis academy, the National Education Foundation (NEF) is a nonprofit organization based in McLean, Virginia. NEF provides disadvantaged students, teachers, employees, and jobseekers tuition-free STEM+ education, particularly in the United States and India. Kuttan remains CEO and chairman of the board. NEF is currently providing $100 million in education grants to help schools navigate the challenges of the pandemic and tackle learning loss.

CyberLearning 
Launched in 1993, the NEF CyberLearning provides students in disadvantaged U.S. schools with access to science, technology, engineering, math, English, social studies, business, and test prep skills (STEM+).  CyberLearning offers 6,000 online courses to help disadvantaged students and adults.  NEF CyberLearning partners with the State University of New York (SUNY) to create STEM+ Academies, a remarkable education solution that includes personalized learning, teacher stipends, student rewards, teacher and parent training. Lehighton Area School District, PA, won NEF's 2016 STEM+ Academy of the Year ($11,000), because their students advanced a grade level in math and reading in just 26 and 27 learning hours respectively. On January 7, 2017, NEF launched a $100 Million Grant initiative for schools across the U.S. to boost STEM education.

Books 
Kuttan’s book Happy Executive — A Systems Approach: Nurturing Mind, Body and Soul is partly his memoir, and partly a self-help guide for business executives. According to Kirkus, the book provides “a methodical, well-organized guide for the world’s future leaders.”

In March 2003, Kuttan and Laurence Peters published a textbook titled From Digital Divide to Digital Opportunity.

Awards 
 In August 2006, Certiport named Kuttan their Global Digital Literacy Champion, an annual prize awarded for spreading computer literacy around the world, stating, "We selected Dr. Appu Kuttan unanimously for this prestigious award because of his outstanding leadership and contributions towards advancing digital literacy in many countries over many years."
 On October 14, 2011, University of Wisconsin-Madison College of Engineering gave Appu Kuttan  a Distinguished Achievement Award for his lifelong work, stating, “One million -- It’s the number of disadvantaged students Appu Kuttan helps via NEF, the nonprofit he founded in 1989, dedicated to bridging academic, digital, and employment divides through digital education.”

Personal life 
Kuttan lives in the Washington DC Metro area with his wife, Claudia, also an alumnus of University of Wisconsin, Madison. They have two adult children, Roger and Maya.

References

External links 
National Education (NEF)
Cyberlearning.org

Living people
21st-century American engineers
Engineers from Kerala
Washington University in St. Louis alumni
University of Kerala alumni
American people of Malayali descent
American male writers of Indian descent
 University of Wisconsin–Madison College of Engineering alumni
1941 births